Mark Norris Lance (born 1959) is a professor in the Philosophy Department and Justice and Peace Studies Program at Georgetown University.

Life 
Lance earned his Ph.D. at the University of Pittsburgh under the direction of Robert Brandom and Nuel Belnap. His main areas of expertise are the philosophy of language, epistemology, philosophical logic, and metaphysics. He also writes and speaks extensively on anarchist theory. Lance is also a critic of anarcho-primitivism and its rejection of language.

He is co-director of the Georgetown University Program on Justice and Peace. He has been the General Director of the Institute for Anarchist Studies and a contributor to its journal, Perspectives on Anarchist Theory. He has been active in a wide range of activist organizations, including work in solidarity with Latin America, Palestine, and South Africa, as well as anti-war, LGBTQ, and global justice work.

Lance protested the arrival of President Álvaro Uribe to teach at Georgetown University in September 2010, and was interviewed by Colombia's El Espectador in a film clip, and in the print editions of The Georgetown Voice.

Works 
 
 Kukla, Rebecca; Lance, Mark Norris 'Yo!' and 'Lo!' : the pragmatic topography of the space of reasons Cambridge, Mass.: Harvard University Press, 2009. ,

References

External links

List of publications
Institute for Anarchist Studies
Fetishizing Process by Mark Lance
"Against Apocalyptic Anarchism" summary

University of Pittsburgh alumni
Philosophers of language
Living people
American anarchists
Georgetown University faculty
American philosophers
1959 births